Vitaliy Polyanskyi (born 30 November 1988) is a Ukrainian professional footballer, who lastly played for FK Utenis. He plays the position of defender. His former clubs include FC Olkom Melitopol, FC Pärnu Vaprus, FC Volyn Lutsk, FC Feniks-Illichovets Kalinine and Lithuanian side FK Mažeikiai.

Club career

FC Pärnu Vaprus
He scored his first Meistriliiga goal on 4 October 2008, in the 87th minute in a 5–5 draw against JK Nõmme Kalju.

1988 births
Living people
Ukrainian footballers
Pärnu JK Vaprus players
FC Volyn Lutsk players
FC Olimpik Donetsk players
Ukrainian expatriate footballers
Expatriate footballers in Estonia
Expatriate footballers in Lithuania
Ukrainian expatriate sportspeople in Lithuania
FK Utenis Utena players
FC Džiugas players
A Lyga players
Association football defenders
FK RFS players
FC Trostianets players
Ukrainian expatriate sportspeople in Estonia
Expatriate footballers in Latvia
Ukrainian expatriate sportspeople in Latvia